The Kimberley deep-soil blind snake (Anilios howi) is a species of snake in the family Typhlopidae. The species is endemic to Australia.

Etymology
The specific name, howi, is in honor of Australian zoologist Richard Alfred How (born 1944).

Geographic range
A. howi is found in the Australian state of Western Australia.

Reproduction
A. howi is oviparous.

References

Further reading
Hedges SB, Marion AB, Lipp KM, Marin J, Vidal N (2014). "A taxonomic framework for typhlopid snakes from the Caribbean and other regions (Reptilia, Squamata)". Caribbean Herpetology (49): 1-61. (Anilios howi, new combination).
Storr GM (1983). "A New Ramphotyphlops (Serpentes: Typhlopidae) from Western Australia". Rec. West. Australian Mus. 10 (4): 315–317. (Ramphotyphlops howi, new species).
Wallach V (2006). "The nomenclatural status of Australian Ramphotyphlops (Serpentes: Typhlopidae)". Bull. Maryland Herp. Soc. 42 (1): 8-24. (Austrotyphlops howi, new combination).

Anilios
Taxa named by Glen Milton Storr
Reptiles described in 1983
Snakes of Australia